In set theory, an amorphous set is an infinite set which is not the disjoint union of two infinite subsets.

Existence
Amorphous sets cannot exist if the axiom of choice is assumed.  Fraenkel constructed a permutation model of Zermelo–Fraenkel with Atoms in which the set of atoms is an amorphous set. After Cohen's initial work on forcing in 1963, proofs of the consistency of amorphous sets with Zermelo–Fraenkel were obtained.

Additional properties
Every amorphous set is Dedekind-finite, meaning that it has no bijection to a proper subset of itself. To see this, suppose that  is a set that does have a bijection  to a proper subset. For each natural number 
However, the converse is not necessarily true: it is consistent for there to exist infinite Dedekind-finite sets that are not amorphous.

No amorphous set can be linearly ordered. Because the image of an amorphous set is itself either amorphous or finite, it follows that every function from an amorphous set to a linearly ordered set has only a finite image.

The cofinite filter on an amorphous set is an ultrafilter. This is because the complement of each infinite subset must not be infinite, so every subset is either finite or cofinite.

Variations
If  is a partition of an amorphous set into finite subsets, then there must be exactly one integer  such that  has infinitely many subsets of size ; for, if every size was used finitely many times, or if more than one size was used infinitely many times, this information could be used to coarsen the partition and split  into two infinite subsets. It is consistent with ZF that amorphous sets exist and are all bounded, or that they exist and are all unbounded.

References

Axiom of choice
Cardinal numbers